Malaysia competed in the 1970 Asian Games held in Bangkok, Thailand from 9 December 1970 to 20 December 1970. This country is ranked number 7 with 5 gold medals, 1 silver medals and 7 bronze medals.

Medal summary

Medals by sport

Medallists

Athletics

Men
Track event

Field event

Badminton

Basketball

Men's tournament
Group C

Seventh to twelfth place classification

Ranked 9th in final standings

Field hockey

Men's tournament
Bronze medal match

Ranked 4th in final standings

Football

Men's tournament
Group B

Ranked 10th in final standings

Water polo

Men's tournament
Ranked 6th in final standings

References

Nations at the 1970 Asian Games
1970
Asian Games